Cyril Harrison may refer to:
Sir Cyril Harrison (businessman) (1901–1980), British businessman in the cotton industry
Cyril Harrison (cricketer) (1915–1998), English cricketer